Gitta Jønsson (5 October 1869 – 6 March 1950) was a Norwegian Labour Party politician and proponent for women's rights.

Early and personal life
Jønsson was born in Tromsøysund, a daughter of Johan Widding Larsen Hagerup and Eline Marie Moe. As a young woman she worked as housemaid in Tromsø and Kristiania, and was eventually running a milk shop along with her sister. She married saddle maker Anders Jønsson in 1903, and they settled in Tromsø, where he established a workshop and she opened a café. Their daughter Bengta Andrea married composer Bjarne Amdahl.

Political career
Jønsson joined the Labour Party in 1909, and founded Tromsø Arbeiderkvinneforening in 1911. Taking part in local politics, she was elected member of the executive council of Tromsø from 1913 to 1925. She was a member of the board of the Norwegian Labour Party from 1923 to 1945, and chaired the Northern Troms chapter for many years. She was elected deputy member to the Storting for the period 1934–1945.

She died in Oslo on 6 March 1950, aged 80.

Literature

References

1859 births
1950 deaths
Politicians from Tromsø
Labour Party (Norway) politicians
Norwegian socialist feminists
Troms politicians
Norwegian women's rights activists
Deputy members of the Storting